The Rakatu Wetlands is a 270 ha wetland restoration project in the South Island of New Zealand. They officially opened on 18 March 2006.

It is administered by the Waiau Fisheries and Wildlife Habitat Enhancement Trust.  The Trust was set up in 1996 to address the environmental effects of the construction of the Manapouri Power Station. Since much of the natural flow of the Waiau River was diverted through the power station and out to sea the ecological characteristics of the river and the wetlands were changed due to lower river levels.

The Trust has constructed walkways and interpretation panels at the wetland.

See also
Wetlands of New Zealand
Conservation in New Zealand

References

External links
Waiau Fisheries and Wildlife Habitat Enhancement Trust

Wetlands of Southland, New Zealand
Protected areas of Southland, New Zealand
Protected areas established in 2006